The 2019 Drive for the Cure 250 presented by Blue Cross Blue Shield of North Carolina is a NASCAR Xfinity Series race held on September 28, 2019, at Charlotte Motor Speedway in Concord, North Carolina. Contested over 67 laps on the 2.28-mile (3.67 km) road course, it was the 28th race of the 2019 NASCAR Xfinity Series season, second race of the Playoffs, and the second race of the Round of 12.

Background

Track

Since 2018, deviating from past NASCAR events at Charlotte, the race will utilize a road course configuration of Charlotte Motor Speedway, promoted and trademarked as the "Roval". The race will be contested over a scheduled distance of 67 laps, .

Entry list

Practice

First practice

Final practice

Qualifying

Qualifying results

. – Playoffs driver

Race

Summary
Chase Briscoe started on pole and maintained his lead, winning Stage 1. Cole Custer overtook teammate Briscoe at the conclusion of Stage 1, and won Stage 2, which did not see any cautions. Alex Labbé notably won points in both stages and also had a career-best finish of 6th.

On lap 45, a caution occurred and four playoff drivers, including Brandon Jones and John Hunter Nemechek, were involved. Afterwards, Briscoe attempted to overtake Christopher Bell for second place. Briscoe drove hard into Bell, running him off the track. Bell was obligated to serve a penalty due to going off-track, but instead chased Briscoe down and deliberately spun him. Bell was ruled by NASCAR to have to restart at the rear of the field. Briscoe suffered as his team spent a long time repairing his car. Neither driver was able to fully recover from the incident, though Bell was already locked into the next round of the playoffs from his win at the previous week's race.

For the other playoffs drivers, Ryan Sieg dealt with fuel pressure issues early in the race, finishing two laps down. Justin Haley experienced mechanical issues and went to the garage for repairs, finishing six laps down.

A. J. Allmendinger had a strong run on the final restart, winning the race with a 2-second lead over Tyler Reddick.

Nemechek, Jones, Sieg, and Haley all exited the race below the cut line for the playoffs.

Stage Results

Stage One
Laps: 20

Stage Two
Laps: 20

Final Stage Results

Stage Three
Laps: 27

. – Playoffs driver

During the race, Stefan Parsons, replaced Cody Ware who was not feeling well after the coolbox of his car didn't work during the race so he felt the heat exhaustion. Since Ware started the race, he is officially credited with the 24th-place finish.

References

2019 in sports in North Carolina
Drive for the Cure 250
NASCAR races at Charlotte Motor Speedway
2019 NASCAR Xfinity Series